Edy Hein (11 August 1929 – 31 July 2006) was a Luxembourgian racing cyclist. He rode in the 1953 Tour de France.

References

1929 births
2006 deaths
Luxembourgian male cyclists
Place of birth missing